Constituency NA-147 may refer to:

 NA-147 (Sahiwal-I), a constituency (after 2018 delimitation) that covers Sahiwal City
 NA-147 (Okara-V), a former constituency based on 2002 delimitation that covers Depalpur Rural areas

National Assembly Constituencies of Pakistan